Sofia Samatar (born October 24, 1971) is an American poet, novelist and educator from Indiana.

Early life
Samatar was born in 1971 in northern Indiana, United States. Her father was the Somali scholar, historian and writer Said Sheikh Samatar. Her mother is a Swiss-German Mennonite from North Dakota. Sofia's parents met in 1970 in Mogadishu, Somalia, while her mother was teaching English.

Samatar attended a Mennonite high school before studying at Goshen College in Goshen, Indiana, where she graduated  with a Bachelor of Arts in English. In 1997, Samatar earned a Master's degree in African languages and literature from the University of Wisconsin-Madison in Madison, Wisconsin and a Ph.D. in 2013 in contemporary Arabic literature. She is an Assistant Professor of English at James Madison University.

Career
Samatar's first novel A Stranger in Olondria was published in 2013.

Samatar has also published qasīdas in English and collaborated with her brother on a book of illustrated prose poems, entitled Monster Portraits, which was published in 2018 by Rose Metal Press. A sequel to A Stranger in Olondria, entitled The Winged Histories, was published by Small Beer Press in 2016.

Samatar's main literary influences include Ernest Hemingway, James Joyce, Virginia Woolf, William Faulkner, and Rainer Maria Rilke, as well as Somali mythology. Samatar served as a nonfiction and poetry editor for Interfictions: A Journal of Interstitial Arts.

In 2022, she published her first nonfiction book, The White Mosque, a memoir about a trip to Uzbekistan in search of the followers of fringe religious leader Claas Epp Jr.

Awards
Samatar's short story "Selkie Stories Are for Losers" was a finalist for both the 2014 Nebula and Hugo Awards for Best Short Story, as well as the British Science Fiction Association Award and the World Fantasy Award.

Samatar's poem "APACHE CHIEF" was a finalist for a Rhysling Award.

In 2014, Samatar won the British Fantasy Award for Best Novel (the Robert Holdstock Award) for her book A Stranger in Olondria. She was also presented the World Fantasy Award for the work. In addition, Samatar received the 2014 John W. Campbell Award for Best New Writer. She likewise won the Crawford Award and was a finalist for the Locus Award for Best First Novel.

Samatar's Monster Portraits, a collection of short fiction published in February 2018, was a finalist for the Calvino Prize.

The White Mosque was a finalist for the 2023 PEN/Jean Stein Book Award.

Personal
Samatar is married to American writer Keith R. Miller. They have two children, Isabel and Dominic (Nico). Although her father was a Muslim, she is a Mennonite like her mother.

Selected bibliography
Novels
A Stranger in Olondria (Small Beer Press, 2013)
The Winged Histories (Small Beer Press, 2016)

Nonfiction
The White Mosque (Catapult, 2022)

Collection

Tender (Small Beer Press, 2017)

Short fiction

"Meet Me in Iram" (Guillotine Series No. 10, 2015)
"The Closest Thing to Animals" (Fireside Fiction, 2015)
"Tender" (OmniVerse, 2015)
"Request for an Extension on the Clarity" (Lady Churchill's Rosebud Wristlet, 2015)
"Those" (Uncanny Magazine, 2015)
"Walkdog" (Kaleidoscope: Diverse YA Science Fiction and Fantasy Stories, 2014)
"A Girl Who Comes Out of a Chamber at Regular Intervals" (Lackington's, 2014)
"Ogres of East Africa" (Long Hidden: Speculative Fiction from the Margins of History, 2014)
"How to Get Back to the Forest" (Lightspeed, 2014)
"Olimpia's Ghost" (Phantom Drift, 2013)
"How I Met the Ghoul" (Eleven Eleven, 2013)
"Bess, the Landlord's Daughter, Goes for Drinks with the Green Girl" (Glitter & Mayhem, 2013)
"I Stole the D.C.'s Eyeglass" (We See a Different Frontier: A Postcolonial Speculative Fiction Anthology, 2013)
"Dawn and the Maiden" (Apex Magazine, 2013)
"Selkie Stories Are for Losers" (Strange Horizons, 2013)
"Honey Bear" (Clarkesworld Magazine, 2012)
"A Brief History of Nonduality Studies" (Expanded Horizons, 2012)
"The Nazir" (Ideomancer, 2012)Monster Portraits (collection) (Rose Metal Press, 2017)Tender (collection) (Small Beer Press, 2017)

Poetry
"Make the Night Go Faster" (Liminality, 2014)
"The Death of Araweilo" (Tor.com, 2014)
"Long-Ear" (Stone Telling, 2014)
"APACHE CHIEF" (Flying Higher: An Anthology of Superhero Poetry, 2013)
"Persephone Set Free" (Mythic Delirium, 2013)
"Undoomed" (Ideomancer, 2013)
"Shahrazad Spoils the Coffee" (Jabberwocky, 2012)
"Snowbound in Hamadan" (Stone Telling, 2012)
"Burnt Lyric" (Goblin Fruit, 2012)
"The Hunchback's Mother" (inkscrawl, 2012)
"Lost Letter" (Strange Horizons, 2012)
"Qasida of the Ferryman" (Goblin Fruit, 2012)
"The Year of Disasters" (Bull Spec, 2012)
"Girl Hours" (Stone Telling, 2011)
"The Sand Diviner" (Stone Telling'', 2011)

References

External links

 

1971 births
Living people
American people of Somali descent
American people of German descent
American people of Swiss descent
Somalian women novelists
American science fiction writers
Women science fiction and fantasy writers
Goshen College alumni
University of Wisconsin–Madison College of Letters and Science alumni
Novelists from Indiana
California State University Channel Islands faculty
James Madison University faculty
21st-century American novelists
21st-century American poets
21st-century American women writers
American women poets
American women novelists
American women short story writers
World Fantasy Award-winning writers
21st-century American short story writers
Poets from Indiana
20th-century Somalian women writers
20th-century Somalian writers
21st-century Somalian women writers
21st-century Somalian writers
African-American Christians
African-American poets
African-American women academics
American women academics
African-American academics
African-American women writers
American Mennonites
Christians from Indiana
Somali Christians
Mennonite writers
Mennonite poets
Weird fiction writers
African-American novelists